The sixth season of the American reality talent show The Voice premiered on February 24, 2014, on NBC. Carson Daly returned to host. Adam Levine and Blake Shelton returned as coaches for their sixth season, while Shakira and Usher returned for their second (of their two of them) season after being replaced by original coaches Christina Aguilera and CeeLo Green in season five. This was the last season to feature Shakira and Usher as coaches.

The Instant Save which first introduced last season returned with a new change which eligible artists performed an additional song. Knockout rounds did not appear this season, although a similar second Battle round took its place. This is the last of the four consecutive seasons to feature a final three, and would increase the finalists to four beginning on the next season.

Josh Kaufman was announced as the winner of the season, marking Usher's first win as a coach. Also, for the first time in the show's history, a stolen artist went on to win the entire season.

Coaches and hosts

The coaching panel once again saw a change as Adam Levine and Blake Shelton were rejoined by season four coaches Shakira and Usher. Christina Aguilera took another hiatus from the show and CeeLo Green departed at the end of season five. Carson Daly returned as host. It was reported that Christina Milian, who served as the social media correspondent in seasons two through four, was open to returning, but ultimately did not.

Artists serving as mentors for the first Battle Rounds included Miranda Lambert (who previously appeared in the second season in the series as an advisor) for Team Shakira, The Band Perry for Team Blake, Jill Scott for Team Usher, and Aloe Blacc for Team Adam.

With the replacement of the Knockout Round with the "Battles, Round 2", Coldplay frontman Chris Martin served as the sole advisor for all four teams.

Development

Auditions

The open call auditions were held in the following locations:

Promotion
A special look at the season was premiered on February 19, 2014, featuring Christina Grimmie's full audition covering Miley Cyrus' "Wrecking Ball". All four coaches turned for her, but her coach choice was not shown. A second special look at the season was premiered the following day, featuring Bria Kelly's full audition covering "Steamroller Blues". All four coaches also turned for her, but like Grimmie, her ultimate coach choice was not shown. A third preview featuring Clarissa Serna's cover of The Cranberries' song "Zombie" was released on February 28, 2014, to promote the second week of the Blind Auditions. Like Grimmie and Kelly, her choice was not shown.

Teams
Color key

Blind auditions
The Blind Auditions were taped between October 10 and 13, 2013. The first episode of the Blind auditions premiered on February 24, 2014.

Color key

Episode 1 (Feb. 24)
The four coaches performed a medley of each other's songs, including "Whenever, Wherever", "Boys 'Round Here", "Love Somebody" and "Without You".

Episode 2 (Feb. 25)

Episode 3 (March 3)

Episode 4 (March 4)

Episode 5 (March 10)

Episode 6 (March 11)

The Battles

Round 1
The Battles, Round 1 (episodes 7 to 15) consisted of two 2-hour episodes and two 1-hour episodes each on March 17, 18, 24 and 25, 2014. There were also two recap episodes that aired on March 23 and 30, 2014. Season six's advisors are Aloe Blacc for Team Adam, Miranda Lambert for Team Shakira, Jill Scott for Team Usher, and The Band Perry for Team Blake. Continuing with the format introduced in season three, the coaches can steal two losing artists from another coach. Contestants who win their battle or are stolen by another coach will advance to The Battles, Round 2, a new round replacing the Knockout round of previous seasons.

Color key:

Week 1 and 2

Round 2
In season six, the Knockout Round was replaced by a second round of Battles, dubbed "The Battles, Round 2," which took place during episodes 14–16 on March 31, April 1, and April 7 respectively. Unlike the first round of The Battles, each team will share the same advisor, Coldplay frontman Chris Martin. Coaches give each Battle pairing a list of songs and each pair must agree on which song to sing. Each coach is allowed one steal this round, like the Knockout round of previous seasons.

Color key:

Week 3 & 4

The Playoffs
The Playoffs began on April 8 and comprised episodes 16 to 18. Similar to seasons four and five, the season six Playoffs were prerecorded and does not have the interactive viewer component, and therefore no subsequent results shows. The top twenty artists performed for the coaches; there was no public vote (hence no iTunes bonus or Instant Save) in the playoffs. Instead, each of the coaches selected two of their own artists to eliminate.

Color key:

 Episodes airing on Monday had a running time of two hours.
 Episodes airing on Tuesday & Sunday had a running time of one hour.

Live shows
The live shows is the final phase of the competition, consisting of five weekly shows and the season finale. For season six, the show expanded upon the "Instant Save" introduced in season five; once the three artists with the lowest vote totals are announced during the results show (except the Live Finale), each of those three artists sing an additional song before the Twitter voting window opens. Also, "Instant Save" vote totals are shown in a ticker bar onscreen during its five-minute voting window (including throughout the commercial break) to update viewers on each contestant's percentage of votes.

Color key:

Week 1 (April 21 & 22)
The Top 12 performed on Monday, April 21, 2014, with results following Tuesday, April 22, 2014.

Josh Kaufman received the first iTunes bonus multiplier of the season, with his studio recording of "Stay With Me" charting at #5 on the iTunes Top 200 Singles chart at the close of the voting window.

Week 2 (April 28 & 29)
The Top 10 performed on Monday, April 28, 2014, with results following Tuesday, April 29, 2014.

This week iTunes multiplier bonuses were awarded to Christina Grimmie (#4). The eliminations for Bria Kelly and Tess Boyer marked only the second time a pair that were put against each other in the battles were eliminated together in the Top 10.

Week 3: Quarterfinals (May 5 & 6)
The Top 8 performed on Monday, May 5, 2014, with results broadcast Tuesday, May 6, 2014. Upcoming coaches for season seven, Gwen Stefani and Pharrell Williams, performed "Hollaback Girl" and "Come Get It Bae" respectively. This week's result show featured had three artists eliminated instead of two, and thus there was a bottom four instead of a bottom three.

iTunes bonus multipliers were awarded to Josh Kaufman (#2) and Grimmie (#5). For the first time since the inclusion of the Instant Save, a contestant was saved for two consecutive weeks.

Week 4: Semifinals (May 12 & 13)
The Top 5 performed on Monday, May 12, 2014, with results following Tuesday, May 13, 2014. This week, each contestant sang two songs; one chosen by their coach, and another selected in tribute to their supporters. The top three season five finalists, (Tessanne Chin, Jacquie Lee, and Will Champlin) debuted their newest singles during the results show.

This week's iTunes bonus multipliers was awarded to Jake Worthington (#3), Kaufman (#4), and Kristen Merlin (#6).

With the elimination of Merlin, Shakira no longer has any contestants remaining on her team.

Week 5: Finale (May 19 & 20)
The Final Three performed on Monday, May 19, 2014, with the season finale on Tuesday, May 20, 2014. Performances in this round consist of a "fans choice" reprise performance of a song from earlier in the season, a duet with the respective coach, and a solo song. This was the latest season to feature a final three competing in the finale.

While Grimmie (#3 and #8) and Worthington (#6, #7 and #9) had singles peaked into the top 10 at the close of the voting window, however, a technical glitch in the iTunes system caused all of the iTunes votes cast being invalidated, but net results were neither affected by it.

Elimination chart

Overall
Color key
Artist's info

Result details

Team
Color key:
Artist's info

Result details

Performances by guests/coaches

Contestant appearances on other talent shows
 Josh Kaufman appeared on Star Search as a junior vocalist (1993).
 T.J. Wilkins was among the Top 6 finalists in ABC's High School Musical: Get in the Picture (2008).
 Bria Kelly appeared in season seven of America's Got Talent, making it to the semifinals.
 Delvin Choice and Jake Worthington sang in the blind auditions for season five, but failed to turn any chairs.
 Melissa Jiménez then went on to compete in season five of La Voz... México and joined team Alejandro. She finished as a top 8 finalist.
 Morgan Wallen later made a brief appearance on the December 3, 2018 episode of WWE RAW and has also been nominated for a CMT Music Award for Breakthrough Video of the Year, a Country Music Association Award for New Artist of the Year, and an Academy of Country Music Award for New Male Artist of the Year respectively. He also went on to have a Platinum album and multiple Platinum singles.
 Madilyn Paige appeared in  season fifteen making it to the Hollywood Rounds. However, her performances did not air.

Ratings
The season six premiere was watched by 15.86 million viewers with a 4.7 rating in the 18–49 demographic.  It was up from last season's premiere by .88 million viewers.

References

External links

Season 06
2014 American television seasons